Pavel Lůžek (born 3 April 1964) is a Czech rower. He competed in the men's quadruple sculls event at the 1988 Summer Olympics.

References

1964 births
Living people
Czech male rowers
Olympic rowers of Czechoslovakia
Rowers at the 1988 Summer Olympics
Sportspeople from Ústí nad Labem